Delta emarginatum is a species of potter wasp in the subfamily Eumeninae of the family Vespidae.

Description
The males are smaller than the females.

Distribution
This species can be found in Libya, Egypt, Ethiopia, Somalia, Mozambique, Angola, Republic of the Congo, Cameroon, Gaboon, Liberia, Niger, Senegal, Mauritania, Central Sahara, Madagascar, Comoro Islands, Eritrea, Guinea-Bissau, Malawi, South Africa, Sudan, Democratic Republic of the Congo.

References

Antonio Giordani Soika (1935) Bull.Soc.ent.Egypte Contributo alla conoscenza degli Eumenini Egiziani (Hymenoptera - Vespidae), Volume: 19 Pages: 161-199
Antonio Giordani Soika (1951) Rivista di Biologia Coloniale Missione biologica Sagan-Omo diretta dal Prof. Edoardo Zavattari. Hymenoptera Vespidae., Volume: 11 Pages: 73-89
Antonio Giordani Soika (1956) Boll.Mus.Civ.Stor.nat.Venezia Studi di Ecologia e Biogeografia XVIII. Biogeografia die Vepidi solitari delle isole del Capo Verde., Volume: 9 Pages: 21-25
Antonio Giordani Soika (1955) Annls Mus.r.Congo Belge Contributions à l'étude de la faune entomologique du Ruanda-Urundi (Mission P. Basilewsky 1953), XLII,. Hymenoptera. Vespides solitarires, Volume: 36 Pages: 362-367
Antonio Giordani Soika (1935) Mems Estud.Mus.zool.Univ.Coimbra Contributions à l'étude de la faune du Mozambique, Volume: 82/I Pages: 1-18
Antonio Giordani Soika (1939) Mem. Soc. Ent. Italiana Raccolte entomologiche del Dr. Alfredo Andreini in Eritrea - Vespidae e Sphegidae, Volume: 18 (1) Pages: 95-105
Giordani Soika, A. 1978. Revisione degli Eumenidi neotropicali appartenenti ai generi Eumenes Latr., Omicron (Sauss.), Pararaphidoglossa Schulth. ed affini. Boll. Mus. Civ. Stor. Nat. Venezia 29: 1-420.
Carpenter, J.M., J. Gusenleitner & M. Madl. 2010a. A Catalogue of the Eumeninae (Hymenoptera: Vespidae) of the Ethiopian Region excluding Malagasy Subregion. Part II: Genera Delta de Saussure 1885 to Zethus Fabricius 1804 and species incertae sedis. Linzer Biologischer Beitrage 42 (1): 95-315.
Bequaert J., 1918. A Revision of the Vespidae of the Belgian Congo Based on the Collection of the American Museum Congo Expedition, With A List of Ethiopian Diplopterous Wasps. Bulletin A. M. N. H, Vol. 39: 2-384.

Potter wasps
Wasps described in 1758
Taxa named by Carl Linnaeus